Equilibrative nucleoside transporter 1 (ENT1) is a protein that in humans is encoded by the SLC29A1 gene. Multiple alternatively spliced variants, encoding the same protein, have been found for this gene. Expressed on red blood cell surfaces, these variants make up the Augustine blood group system.

Function 

This gene is a member of the equilibrative nucleoside transporter family. The gene encodes a transmembrane glycoprotein that localizes to the plasma and mitochondrial membranes and mediates the cellular uptake of nucleosides from the surrounding medium. The protein is categorized as an equilibrative (as opposed to concentrative) transporter that is sensitive to inhibition by nitrobenzylmercaptopurine ribonucleoside (NBMPR). Nucleoside transporters are required for nucleotide synthesis in cells that lack de novo nucleoside synthesis pathways, and are also necessary for the uptake of cytotoxic nucleosides used for cancer and viral chemotherapies.

Genomics

The gene encoding this protein is located on the short arm of chromosome 6 at 6p21.2-p21.1 on the Watson (plus) strand. It is 14,647 bases in length. The encoded protein has 456 amino acid residues  with 11 predicted transmembrane domains. The predicted molecular weight is 50.219 kiloDaltons. The protein is post translationally glycosylated and expressed in all tissue with the apparent exception of skeletal muscle. The highest levels are found in the liver, heart, testis, spleen, lung, kidney and brain.

Interactive pathway map

Clinical significance

Mutations in this gene have been associated with H syndrome, pigmented hypertrichosis with insulin dependent diabetes and Faisalabad histiocytosis.

Alleles of this gene make up the Augustine blood group system. Some of the four known variants are highly immunogenic and antibodies against them can cause acute hemolytic transfusion reaction and hemolytic disease of the fetus and newborn.

See also 
 Solute carrier family
 Equilibrative nucleoside transporters
 Nucleoside transporters
Augustine blood group system

References

Further reading 

 
 
 
 
 
 
 
 
 
 
 
 
 
 
 

Solute carrier family
Neurotransmitter transporters